Sorena Sattari  (born 1972) is an Iranian scientist, inventor. He was the vice president of science and technology, under President Hassan Rouhani and Ebrahim Raisi from 2013 to 2022.

Education
Sattari received a Bachelor of Science, a Master of Science and a Doctor of Philosophy in Mechanical Engineering from Sharif University of Technology, Iran.

References

External links
 https://archive.today/20131106024143/http://theiranproject.com/blog/tag/vice-president-for-science-and-technology-affairs-sorena-sattari/
 http://www.irandailybrief.com/2013/10/07/vp-for-science-and-technology-appointed/
 https://archive.today/20131106024048/http://www.tehrantimes.com/politics/111295-rouhani-appoints-vice-president-for-scientific-affairs-
 http://english.farsnews.com/newstext.aspx?nn=13920707001156
 http://www.patentbuddy.com/Inventor/Sattari-Sorena/15256108

1972 births
Living people
Politicians from Tehran
Sharif University of Technology alumni
Vice presidents of Iran
Iranian mechanical engineers
20th-century Iranian engineers
21st-century Iranian engineers